The Luxembourg Billie Jean King Cup team represents Luxembourg in the Billie Jean King Cup tennis competition and are governed by the Fédération Luxembourgeoise de Tennis.  They currently compete in the Europe/Africa Zone of Group II.

History
Luxembourg competed in its first Fed Cup in 1972.  Their best result was reaching the round of 16 in 1973 and 1979.

Current team (2022)
Mandy Minella
Eléonora Molinaro
Claudine Schaul
Erna Brdarevic
Marie Weckerle

See also
Fed Cup
Luxembourg Davis Cup team

External links

Billie Jean King Cup teams
Fed Cup
Fed Cup